Maki Eguchi (江口真紀, born 14 October 1978) is a Japanese former basketball player who competed in the 2004 Summer Olympics.

References

1978 births
Living people
Japanese women's basketball players
Olympic basketball players of Japan
Basketball players at the 2004 Summer Olympics